The Perfect Crime (/ Investigation of a Perfect Crime) is a 1978 Italian giallo-crime film directed by Giuseppe Rosati and starring Leonard Mann. It was one of the last features for actor Anthony Steel.

Cast
 Gloria Guida as Polly Rennie
 Leonard Mann as Sir Paul De Revere
 Joseph Cotten as Sir Arthur Dundy
 Adolfo Celi as Sir Harold Boyd
 Anthony Steel as Supt. Jeff Hawks
 Janet Agren as Lady Gloria Boyd
 Alida Valli as Lady Clementine de Revere
 Franco Ressel as Sgt. Phillips
 Paul Muller as Gibson
 Mario Novelli (as Anthony Freeman) as saboteur
 Elio Stefanizzi
 Claudio Gora
 Tom Felleghy as Dr. Hobbes (uncredited)

References

External links

1978 films
1978 crime films
Italian crime films
1970s Italian-language films
Films directed by Giuseppe Rosati
Films scored by Carlo Savina
1970s Italian films